BRP General Antonio Luna was the second ship of the General Emilio Aguinaldo class patrol vessel of the Philippine Navy. This ship, along with her only sistership BRP General Emilio Aguinaldo (PG-140), was one of the last that were made in the Cavite Naval Ship Yard. The original plan called for 6 Aguinaldo class vessels to be built, but this number may not be reached.

She was decommissioned on 8 April 2016.

Technical details
The ship's basic hull design was based on the Japanese-designed Tirad Pass SAR vessel, and the superstructure was adopted from the German-designed Kagitingan class. The class's design was found to be overloaded and underpowered and due to this, there were no more plans to build all the ships originally planned.

The present weapon systems of the ship are composed of manually operated gun platforms, some guns which are from World War II era. They are composed of two Mk.3 Bofors 40 mm 60-cal single-mount guns acting as the ship's primary weapon, together with two 20 mm Oerlikon single-mount anti-aircraft guns and four 12.7 mm general purpose machine guns.

The ship is powered by two GM Detroit Diesel 12V92 TA diesel engines with a combined power of around  driving four propellers.

References

External links 
 World Warships Website – Philippines

1992 ships
Ships of the Philippine Navy